is a Japanese middle-distance runner. She competed in the women's 800 metres at the 1964 Summer Olympics.

References

1943 births
Living people
Athletes (track and field) at the 1964 Summer Olympics
Japanese female middle-distance runners
Olympic athletes of Japan
Place of birth missing (living people)
20th-century Japanese women
21st-century Japanese women